Bob, Peter, Bunny & Rita is a roots reggae album by Bob Marley & the Wailers, released posthumously in 1985, four years after Marley's death. All tracks were previously unreleased recordings by Jad Records Co., Inc.

Track listing
All tracks written by Bob Marley, except where noted.

Side one
"Oh Lord" (Johnny Nash, Bob Marley) – 2:39
"It Hurts to Be Alone" (Bob Marley, Bunny Livingston, Peter Tosh) – 2:45
"Lonesome Feelings" – 4:51
"Milk Shake and Potato Chips" (Jimmy Norman, Al Pyfrom) – 3:04
"Touch Me" – 4:26

Side two
"Lonely Girl" (Jimmy Norman, Al Pyfrom, Dorothy Hughes) – 4:35
"The World is Changing" (Jimmy Norman, Al Pyfrom) – 3:58
"Treat You Right" (Jimmy Norman, Al Pyfrom) – 2:18
"Soul Shake Down Party" – 3:07

Personnel
Bob Marley – lead vocal, backing vocals
Peter Tosh – lead vocal, backing vocals
Bunny "Wailer" Livingston – lead vocal, backup vocals
Rita Marley – lead vocal, backing vocals
Sammy Merindino – drums
Gregg Mangifico – keyboard & synthesizer
Elliot Randall – guitar
Eric Gale – guitar
Neil Jason – bass
Clevie Johnson – bass
Sergio Castillo – percussion
Jamaica Military Band and Hugh Masekela – horns
Technical
Mixed by Reggie Thompson for The Thompson Group
Mixing Engineer: Hugo Dwyer
Asst. Mixing Engineer: Matthew Kasha
Mixed at Quadrasonic Sound Systems
Mixed at Park South Studios by Joe Venneri, Brighton Entertainment Company
Recording Engineers: Joe Venneri, Richard Alderson, Bill Garnett
Asst. Recording Engineers: Craig Johnson, Jamie Chaleff

References
Rocklist Discography's - A Consumers Guide to: Bob Marley & The Wailers
The Electronic Wailers Discography
Soul Rebels - The Complete Research 

Albums published posthumously
Bob Marley and the Wailers compilation albums
1985 albums